Dame Jane Elizabeth Dacre,  is a British rheumatologist and medical scholar. She is Professor of Medical Education at University College London, former director of UCL Medical School, and past medical director of the MRCP(UK) exam. In April 2014, she was elected to succeed Sir Richard Thompson as President of the Royal College of Physicians of London. She had previously served as Academic Vice President of the College. In 2018 Andrew Goddard was elected as her successor; she served as president until 26 September 2018.

Biography
Dacre studied at the University College Hospital Medical School, graduating with a medical degree in 1980. She trained in rheumatology at St Bartholomew's Hospital and now practices at the Whittington Hospital in North London. She has made contributions to the physical examination of the musculoskeletal system and developed an interest in medical education.

Her more recent work has included study of the performance of doctors at postgraduate exams, including the influence of gender and ethnic background. She was formerly a member of the General Medical Council from 2009–12.

Accolades and honours
She was reckoned by the Health Service Journal to be the 46th most influential person in the English NHS in 2015. In May 2018, it was announced that Dacre would be leading a review into the gender pay gap in medicine in the UK. In the 2018 Birthday Honours, Dacre was appointed a Dame Commander of the Order of the British Empire (DBE) for services to medicine and medical education.

Personal life
She is married to media executive Nigel Dacre. He is the younger brother of journalist Paul Dacre, former editor of The Daily Mail.

References

Living people
British rheumatologists
21st-century British medical doctors
Fellows of the Royal College of Physicians
Presidents of the Royal College of Physicians
Academics of University College London
Alumni of the UCL Medical School
Dames Commander of the Order of the British Empire
Year of birth missing (living people)
Women rheumatologists
21st-century women physicians